Leadville Municipal Airport (Leadville Army Airfield ) was a Colorado World War II Army Airfield "adjacent to Highway No. 24" and named for Leadville, Colorado,  southeast.

Leadville Flight Strip
On September 10, 1943, the existing Leadville Flight Strip of ~ included a  landing strip, and the "buildings area" was ~.

Leadville Army Airfield
The Leadville landing field became* a United States Army Air Forces Third Air Force auxiliary field of Colorado Springs' Peterson Field which was a photo reconnaissance training facility and base of the 35th Altitude Training Unit.

Municipal airport
After being used as a post-war municipal airport, the Leadville facility closed and was dismantled by 1949.

References
*Peterson AAF gliders were used for Camp Hale's Mountain Training Center (October 10, 1942 – October 23, 1943), which operated for a few months at the beginning of Leadville Army Airfield.  Camp Hale also had a Military Munitions Site where unexploded ordnance was found in 2002.

Airfields of the United States Army Air Forces in Colorado
Transportation buildings and structures in Lake County, Colorado
Flight Strips of the United States Army Air Forces
1943 establishments in Colorado
Airports established in 1943